Kandla Airport  is located north of Kandla and Varsamedi Village Anjar in the Kutch District of the state of Gujarat, India.

History
The airport was built in the late 1950s. Indian Airlines commenced passenger operations by deploying DC-3 Dakota aircraft and later in 1960 using their F-27 Fokker Friendship aircraft & by HS748 Avro aircraft and was followed by Vayudoot. Gujarat Airways also used to operate flights to Mumbai until 1999. After a gap of seven years, commercial services resumed again in October 2006 with Air Deccan operating daily services between Mumbai and Kandla using ATR aircraft until the airline ceased operations in 2012. Spicejet commenced service again in July 2017 using Bombardier Q400 aircraft.

Structure
The airport is spread over an area of 268.2 acres and has a terminal building capable of handling 100 passengers at a time. Its apron measuring 90 m x 60 m has two parking bays for ATR aircraft. The airport has navigational facilities and landing aids like NDB and PAPI.

Airlines and destinations

References

External links
Kandla Airport at the Airports Authority of India

Airports in Gujarat
Transport in Kutch district
Gandhidham
Airports established in 1960
1960 establishments in East Punjab
20th-century architecture in India